The Committee for Non-Violent Action (CNVA) was an American anti-war group, formed in 1957 to resist the US government's program of nuclear weapons testing. It was one of the first organizations to employ nonviolent direct action to protest against the nuclear arms race.

The CNVA's immediate antecedent, a committee known as Non-Violent Action Against Nuclear Weapons, was formed by radical Quaker Lawrence Scott. Other leaders of the CNVA included A.J. Muste, Albert Bigelow, Bayard Rustin and George Willoughby.

History
In August 1957, members of the CNVA were arrested when they attempted to enter the Camp Mercury nuclear testing grounds near Las Vegas, Nevada. In February 1958, Albert Bigelow and the crew of the Golden Rule were intercepted by the US Coast Guard five nautical miles (9 km) from Honolulu, Hawaii as they attempted to sail their vessel into the Eniwetok Proving Grounds, the US test site in the Marshall Islands. Two further attempts to defy a hastily enacted regulation banning US citizens from sailing to the test site led to the arrest and 60-day imprisonment of the crew.

The voyage of the Golden Rule inspired anthropologist Earle L. Reynolds and his family to undertake a similar journey, and on 1 July 1958, their yacht, Phoenix of Hiroshima, entered the test zone at Bikini Atoll. The Phoenix penetrated  into the test area before the vessel was boarded by the Coast Guard and ordered to sail to Kwajalein atoll, where Reynolds was charged with violating the Atomic Energy Commission's new regulation.

In 1959, CNVA sponsored protests at the construction site of an intercontinental ballistic missile near Omaha, Nebraska. Around 15 protestors, including A.J. Muste and Karl H. Meyer, the son of Vermont Senator William Meyer, were arrested and handcuffed as they climbed the fence to invade the site. They were each sentenced to six months in jail. In 1960, the group co-ordinated nonviolent protests against construction of the nuclear weapons equipped Polaris submarine in New London, Connecticut.

During the early 1960s, the CNVA organised two 'Walks for Peace', including a  march from San Francisco to Moscow, during which the walkers called on the governments of the world to disarm. During a Walk for Peace from Quebec to Cuba, via Washington, walkers were attacked and jailed as black and white activists walked together through Macon, Georgia. Both walks were led by peace activist Bradford Lyttle. 

In the mid-1960s, CNVA began to focus on the Vietnam War. Activists traveled to Hanoi in Vietnam and picketed the US embassy, and the CNVA advocated tax refusal as a method of resistance.

In 1968, after the 1967 death of leader A.J. Muste, the CNVA merged with the pacifist War Resisters League.

Legacy
While never a mass-membership organization, the CNVA's pioneering use of nonviolent direct action would have a significant influence on movements to follow. In particular, it was the example set by the voyages of the Golden Rule and the Phoenix that would inspire the first Greenpeace activists to use similar methods in their campaigns to halt nuclear testing at the island of Amchitka, Alaska, and at Muraroa Atoll in the Pacific.

See also 
 Civil disobedience
 List of anti-war organizations
 List of peace activists
 Nonviolence
 Committee for a Sane Nuclear Policy (SANE, Inc.)
 Timeline of riots and civil unrest in Omaha, Nebraska

References

External links 
Records of the Committee for Nonviolent Action, Swarthmore College Peace Collection
In Pursuit of Peace From the UC Santa Cruz Library
Doom and Passion Along Rt. 45 by Thomas Morgan (Esquire, 1962)

American tax resisters
Anti–nuclear weapons movement
Peace organizations based in the United States
Organizations established in 1957
Organizations disestablished in 1968